The Atakora River is a tributary of Lake Volta in Ghana, it flows about 60 km east to the Lake Volta. Its entire course is in south Ghana.

References

Rivers of Ghana